Gene Verge Sr. (April 7, 1893- August 27, 1953) was a Canadian-born American architect.

Early life
Gene Verge Sr. was born in Canada on April 7, 1893. He graduated from the École des beaux-arts de Montréal.

Career
Verge moved to Los Angeles, California and started working for the Pozzo Construction Co.

In 1934, Verge designed the 13.4-acre St Luke's Hospital, also known as the St. Luke Medical Center, located at 2632 East Washington Boulevard in Bungalow Heaven, Pasadena, California. It is a mix of art deco and Spanish Colonial Revival architecture. It was designated as a City Landmark in 2002. In 2007, it was purchased by DS Ventures, a real estate developer.

Verge designed the building of the Jonathan Club in Santa Monica, California. He also designed homes in Beverly Hills, California, including an X-shaped property for actor Buster Keaton (1895-1966). In the early 1950s, he designed St. Bartholomew School in Long Beach, California.

Death
Verge died on August 27, 1953, in Los Angeles, California.

References

1893 births
1953 deaths
Canadian emigrants to the United States
Architects from Los Angeles
Canadian architects
20th-century American architects
École des beaux-arts de Montréal alumni